Limnonectes cintalubang is a species of fanged frogs in the family Dicroglossidae. It is endemic to western Sarawak, East Malaysia (Borneo), and is only known from to locations. It is closely related to Limnonectes hikidai.

Limnonectes cintalubang occurs in secondary forest with mixed bamboo and broad-leaf trees. They can be found near burrows that they use to hide when disturbed. Reproduction probably takes place in streams.

References

cintalubang
Amphibians of Malaysia
Amphibians of Borneo
Endemic fauna of Malaysia
Endemic fauna of Borneo
Amphibians described in 2014
Taxa named by Masafumi Matsui
Taxa named by Kanto Nishikawa